Wilma Glücklich is a German politician of the Christian Democratic Union (CDU) and former member of the German Bundestag.

Life 
In 1974 Glücklich joined the CDU, where she became state chairwoman of the Women's Union and a member of the Berlin state executive committee. From 1994 to 1998 she was represented in the German Bundestag. She entered parliament via the Berlin state list.

References 

1952 births
Living people
Members of the Bundestag for Berlin
Members of the Bundestag 1994–1998
Female members of the Bundestag
20th-century German women politicians
Members of the Bundestag for the Christian Democratic Union of Germany